The 2019 Copa do Brasil third stage was the third stage of the 2019 Copa do Brasil football competition. It was played from 13 March to 20 April 2019. A total of 20 teams competed in the third stage to decide ten places in the fourth stage of the 2019 Copa do Brasil.

Format
In the third stage, each tie was played on a home-and-away two-legged basis. If tied on aggregate, the away goals rule would not be used, extra time would not be played and the penalty shoot-out would be used to determine the winner. Host teams were settled in a draw held on 8 March 2019, 11:00 at CBF headquarters in Rio de Janeiro.

Matches
All times are Brasília time, BRT (UTC−3)

|}

Match 61

Corinthians won 3–2 on aggregate and advanced to the fourth round.

Match 62

Vila Nova won 3–2 on aggregate and advanced to the fourth round.

Match 63

Juventude won 3–2 on aggregate and advanced to the fourth round.

Match 64

Santa Cruz won 3–1 on aggregate and advanced to the fourth round.

Match 65

Fluminense won 2–0 on aggregate and advanced to the fourth round.

Match 66

Bahia won 2–1 on aggregate and advanced to the fourth round.

Match 67

Santos won 3–1 on aggregate and advanced to the fourth round.

Match 68

Chapecoense won 5–2 on aggregate and advanced to the fourth round.

Match 69

Londrina won 5–3 on aggregate and advanced to the fourth round.

Match 70

Vasco da Gama won 4–2 on aggregate and advanced to the fourth round.

References

2019 Copa do Brasil